The al-Wasat Party, translated in English as the Center Party, is a moderate Islamist political party in Egypt.

The party withdrew from the Anti-Coup Alliance on 28 August 2014. A court case was brought forth to dissolve the party, though the Alexandria Urgent Matters Court ruled on 26 November 2014 that it lacked jurisdiction.

Foundation 
The party was founded by Abou Elela Mady in 1996, which Mady accused of having "narrow political horizons." The creation of al-Wasat was criticized by the Brotherhood, which said Mady was trying to split the movement. It was also not well received by the Egyptian government, which brought its founders before a military court on the charge of setting up a party as an Islamist front.

Al-Wasat tried to gain an official license four times between 1996 and 2009, but its application was rejected each time by the political parties committee, which was chaired by a leading member of the ruling National Democratic Party. Political parties formed on the basis of religion have been banned by the Egyptian constitution since an amendment to Article 5 was approved in 2007. The leader of the party, Abou Elela Mady, as well as deputy head Essam Sultan, have been detained following the 2013 Egyptian coup d'état.

Recognition
Al-Wasat was granted official recognition on 19 February 2011 after a court in Cairo approved its establishment. The court's ruling was handed down in the wake of the Egyptian Revolution of 2011, and made al-Wasat the first new party to gain official status after the resignation of President Hosni Mubarak. Its newly acquired official status allowed al-Wasat to compete in the next parliamentary election, and made it the first legal party in Egypt with an Islamic background.

Ideology
The party asserts that its aim is to promote a tolerant version of Islam with liberal tendencies. Its founder Mady highlights as proof of this openness the fact that two Copts and three women are among the party's 24 top members. According to the Carnegie Endowment for International Peace, al-Wasat "seeks to interpret Islamic sharia principles in a manner consistent with the values of a liberal democratic system. Although al-Wasat advocates a political system that is firmly anchored in Islamic law, it also views sharia principles as flexible and wholly compatible with the principles of pluralism and equal citizenship rights." The party's manifesto accepts the right of a Christian to become head of state in a Muslim-majority country. Its founder Mady likens its ideology to that of the Turkish Justice and Development Party (AKP).

See also
List of political parties in Egypt

References

Further reading

External links
https://twitter.com/Alwasatpartyeg

1996 establishments in Egypt
2013 Egyptian coup d'état
Centrist parties in Egypt
Egyptian revolution of 2011
Islamic political parties in Egypt
Organisations of the Egyptian Crisis (2011–2014)
Political parties established in 1996
Political parties in Egypt